Senis is a comune (municipality) in the Province of Oristano in the Italian region Sardinia, located about  north of Cagliari and about  southeast of Oristano.

Senis borders the following municipalities: Assolo, Asuni, Laconi, Nureci, Villa Sant'Antonio.

Demographic evolution

References

Cities and towns in Sardinia